Cem İlkel (born 21 August 1995) is a Turkish tennis player.

İlkel has a career high ATP singles ranking of No. 144 achieved on 29 November 2021. He also has a career high ATP doubles ranking of No. 299 achieved on 27 August 2018. He has won one ATP Challenger title in singles. Ilkel has a singles final record of 5 wins and 19 losses, and a doubles final record of 13 wins and 11 losses.

Professional career
He made his Grand Slam debut at the 2017 US Open as a qualifier. In eight attempts at gaining entry through qualifying, Ilkel did not reach the main draw of a Grand Slam tournament.  But on his ninth attempt he reached the main draw of the 2021 US Open.

He won his only ATP Challenger Tour title thus far in his career at the 2020 Open Quimper Bretagne, which was held in Quimper, France. In the final, he defeated Maxime Janvier of France, 7–6(8–6), 7–5.

Playing for Turkey in Davis Cup, İlkel has a W/L record of 12–18.

ATP Challenger and ITF Futures finals

Singles: 25 (5–19)

Doubles: 24 (13–11)

Performance timeline

Singles

References

External links
 
 
 

1995 births
Living people
Turkish male tennis players
Sportspeople from Istanbul
21st-century Turkish people